was a town located in Kamiminochi District, Nagano Prefecture, Japan.

As of 2003, the town had an estimated population of 5,762 and a density of 81.46 persons per km². The total area was 70.73 km².

On January 1, 2010, Shinshūshinmachi, along with the village of Nakajō (also from Kamiminochi District), was merged into the expanded city of Nagano.

References

External links
 Nagano official website 

Dissolved municipalities of Nagano Prefecture
Nagano (city)